Japan Entertainment Television, or JET TV, is a television station in Taiwan that broadcasts programs relating to aspects of Japanese culture. JET TV was founded in Singapore in 1996, and expanded to Taiwan in January 1997 under SEC TV.

For a short time, it aired subtitled or dubbed Japanese TV shows, especially Japanese Dramas, in the Philippines before it went off the air.

External links
 JET TV official website

1997 establishments in Taiwan
Television stations in Taiwan
Television channels and stations established in 1997